Fira de Barcelona is Barcelona’s trade fair institution.  Every year, it organises numerous trade shows and congresses.

Information of interest
It hosts over 150 trade shows, congresses and corporate events per year with 30,000 exhibitors, both direct and represented, and receives 2.5 million visitors from over 200 countries. Its annual economic contribution to the city of Barcelona and its surroundings is estimated at over 4,700 million Euros.

Fira de Barcelona works to develop new opportunities for overseas business, especially in Asia and Latin America, geared to increasing the participation of Fira exhibitors in events in other countries, replicating some shows that are held in Barcelona and selling services, technology, management and advice to other organisers and exhibition centres.

History
Barcelona's trade fair tradition dates back to the Exposición Universal of 1888 and the Exposición Internacional of 1929.

In 1932, Fira Internacional de Barcelona was officially constituted, declared for public use and, in 2000, the Generalitat de Catalunya was incorporated in the government organs, together with the Barcelona City Council and the Barcelona Chamber of Commerce.

Three large venues: Montjuïc, Gran Via and the CCIB

Fira de Barcelona has over 400,000 m2 of exhibition floor space and is one of the largest in Europe, divided into two large venues: the emblematic Montjuïc and the modern Gran Via, designed by the Japanese architect Toyo Ito. In November 2021, Fira de Barcelona took over the management of the CCIB (Barcelona International Convention Centre) becoming the leading operator in Barcelona.

Congresses 
Fira de Barcelona hosts numerous congresses and business, social, cultural and institutional events in the facilities of the Montjuïc and Gran Via exhibition centres, where the Palau de Congresos de Barcelona and the Centro de Convenciones are located, respectively.

Notable events held in Fira de Barcelona are MWC Barcelona (MWC) Barcelona, Integrated Systems Europe (ISE), Salón del Manga de Barcelona, and Automobile Barcelona.

Among other events, Fira hosted the World Cardiology Congress in 2006 and the European Cardiology Congress in 1999 and 2009, organised by the European Society of Cardiology; the 14th World AIDS in 2002, organised by the International AIDS Society; The International Rotary Club Convention in 2002, organised by Rotary International; the United Nations meeting on Climate Change in 2009; and ITMA, the world's largest international textile machinery exhibition held in 2011 and 2019, organised by CEMATEX.

Public transport 
Fira Montjuïc

Metro: Lines L1, L3 and L8 Espanya Station.

Bus: Lines D20, H12, V7, 9, 13, 27, 37, 50, 65, 79, 91, 109, 150 and 165, direct bus to El Prat Airport

Train: FGC Plaça d'Espanya station, Lines: S8, S33, R6, R5 and S4

Fira Gran Vía

Metro: Line L9, Fira station or lines L8 and L9 Europa-Fira station.

Bus: Line 79 links Gran Via to Montjuïc and other areas of the city.

Train: Lines S8, S33, R6, R5 and S4. Ferrocarrils de la Generalitat de Catalunya (FGC).

Direct service between Plaça Espanya (Montjuïc Exhibition Centre) and Europa-Fira (Gran Via Exhibition Centre) stations.

References

External links 

 Fira de Barcelona 

Trade fairs in Spain
Convention centers in Catalonia
Companies based in Barcelona
Economy of Catalonia
Buildings and structures in Barcelona
Tourist attractions in Barcelona
1932 establishments in Spain